Sylvie Bélanger (8 May 1951 - 8 October 2020) was a Canadian interdisciplinary artist using sound, video, photography and installation.  She lived and worked in Toronto as an Associate Professor of Visual Studies at SUNY Buffalo until her retirement in 2017. Where after, she moved to Montréal.

Early life
Bélanger received an MFA from York University, a BFA from Concordia University and a Baccalauréat in Philosophy of Religion from Université de Montréal.

Work
Bélanger exhibited her multimedia installations across Canada, USA, France, Germany, Spain, England, the Netherlands, Japan, Thailand, Philippines and China.

Joan Murray discussed her works such as He and She (1992) in "Canadian Art in the Twentieth Century" (1999) saying it was witty and mysterious. In 2002 Bélanger was commissioned to create public art for the Bessarion subway station in Toronto. The work is a series of friezes of hands, feet and backs of heads, which represent the users of the station. The feet images appear on the concourse level while the heads appear on the platform level. The hand images appear along the stairs between the Sheppard Avenue  side entrance/exit and the concourse.

Death
Bélanger died on 8 October 2020 of cancer at the age of 69.

Collections
Gemeente Museum, The Netherlands, 
Oakville Galleries, Ontario
Art Windsor-Essex, Ontario 
Musée national des beaux-arts du Québec
The Canada Council for the Arts Art Bank 
Art Gallery of Guelph 
Woodlawn Arts Foundation, Toronto

Awards
Bélanger was the recipient of the Stauffer Prize awarded by the Canada Council for the Arts

Further reading
 Bélanger, Sylvie and Lorenzo Buj. "Meditation." Reading the Gaze. C. Barber, S. Kivland and C. Leyser, (eds). London: Bookwork, 1991. 51-70.
 C. Christie. "Sylvie Bélanger." Canadian News Makers. Toronto: Gale Canada, 1997. 48-51.
 Allucquère R. Stone, M. Heim, D. de Kerckhove, L. Dompierre Press Enter, Between Seduction and Disbelief.  Toronto: The Power Plant. 1995
 Cheetam, Mark. Remembering Postmodernism: Trends in Recent Canadian Art. Toronto: Oxford, University of Toronto, 1991. 
 The Cutting Edge Women's Research Group, editor. Desire By Design: Body, Territories and New Technologies. 1999. 82. 
 Grande, John K. "Intertwining: Artists, Landscape, Issues, Technology" 1998. 105 
 Jolicoeur, Nicole. Emettre du silence in Trans-mission. Montréal: La Centrale/Powerhouse Remue-Ménage, 1996. 68-73.
 Marks, L.U.  "Press / Enter", Artforum (Sept. 1995): 97.
 Murray, J. Canadian Art in the Twentieth Century. Toronto: Dundurn Press, 1999. 272-93.
 Ylitalo, K. "Sylvie Bélanger." Redaktion Allegmeines Kunstlerlexikon. München-Leipzig, Germany: K.G. Saur Verlad 2008.
 "Tu me manques" Art Forum Azamino. (vol. 3, June 2007)
 "Sylvie Bélanger at Portside." Madame FIGARO. #342 (06/06/2007): 78.

References

External links
 Official Website

1951 births
2020 deaths
Canadian video artists
Women video artists
Canadian multimedia artists
Artists from Quebec
French Quebecers
Canadian contemporary artists
Canadian women artists
Canadian installation artists
Interdisciplinary artists
Concordia University alumni
20th-century Canadian artists
21st-century Canadian artists